Køge Boldklub is a Danish football club from Køge, Zealand.

History
In 1954, the club became the first outside Copenhagen to win the Danish Championship.

The club declared bankruptcy in February 2009, but continued as an amateur side in the Sjællandsserie.

In March 2009 the first team merged with Herfølge Boldklub, to form HB Køge.

Notable former players
see also

Managers

 Eduard Veroik (1935–1936)
 Paul Baumgarten (1937–1941)
 Fritz Molnar (1941–1942)
 Sofus Johansen (1942–1945)
 Alf Young (1945–1947)
 Paul Baumgarten (1947–1948)
 Frank Petersen (1948–1950)
 Vestervig Madsen (1950–1952)
 Lajos Szendrődi (1952–1955)
 János Nagy (1955–1956)
 Alf Young (1956–1957)
 Karl Aage Hansen (1957–1958)
 Egon Sørensen (1958–1960)
 Edvin Hansen &  Willy Koch (1960–1962)
 Joszef Szentgyörgyi (1962)
 Edvin Hansen (1962–1963)
 Mario Astorri (1963–1965)
 Barkev Chekerdemian (1965–1967)
 Svend Hugger (1968)
 Kaj Pilmark (1969)
 Willy Schøne (1970–1973)
 Edvin Hansen (1974–1977)
 Kresten Bjerre (1978–1979)
 Leif Sørensen (1980–1982)
 Jan B. Poulsen (1983–1986)
 Peter Poulsen (1987–1988)
 Heinz Hildebrandt (1988–1990)
 Jan Jakobsen (1990–1991)
 Eigil Hansen (1991)
 Leif Sørensen (1991–1992)
 Hardy Gynild (1992)
 Erik Rasmussen (1993–1997)
 Benny Johansen (1997–1999)
 Henrik Jensen (1999–2003)
 John 'Tune' Kristiansen (2003–2004)
 Gregor Rioch (2004–2006)
 Henrik Larsen (2006–2008)
 Jimmy Kastrup (2008–2009)

Achievements
 Danish championship titles: 1954, 1975
34 seasons in the Highest Danish League
25 seasons in the Second Highest Danish League
6 seasons in the Third Highest Danish League

References

External links
 Official site

 
Football clubs in Denmark
1927 establishments in Denmark